Prince Li of the First Rank, or simply Prince Li, was the title of a princely peerage used in China during the Manchu-led Qing dynasty (1644–1912). As the Prince Li peerage was not awarded "iron-cap" status, this meant that each successive bearer of the title would normally start off with a title downgraded by one rank vis-à-vis that held by his predecessor. However, the title would generally not be downgraded to any lower than a feng'en fuguo gong except under special circumstances.

The first bearer of the title was Yunreng (1674–1725), the Kangxi Emperor's second son and former heir apparent for two terms between 1675 and 1712. After Yunreng died, he was posthumously honoured with the title "Prince Li of the First Rank" by his fourth brother, the Yongzheng Emperor, who succeeded their father. The title was passed down over eight generations and held by ten persons.

Members of the Prince Li peerage

 Yunreng (1674–1725), the Kangxi Emperor's second son, posthumously honoured as Prince Limi of the First Rank (理密親王) in 1724
 Hongxi (弘晳; 1694–1742), Yunreng's second son, held the title Prince Li of the Second Rank from 1723 to 1728, promoted to Prince Li of the First Rank in 1728, stripped of his title in 1739
 Hongwei (弘㬙; 1719–1780), Yunreng's tenth son, held the title of a feng'en fuguo gong from 1736 to 1739, promoted to Prince Li of the Second Rank in 1739, posthumously honoured as Prince Like of the Second Rank (理恪郡王)
 Yong'ai (永曖; 1742–1789), Hongwei's eldest son, held the title of a third class fuguo jiangjun from 1770 to 1780, promoted to beile in 1780
 Mianpu (綿溥; 1767–1801), Yong'ai's second son, held the title of a beizi from 1789 to 1801
 Yihao (奕灝; 1784–1844), Mianpu's eldest son, held the title of a feng'en zhenguo gong from 1801 to 1830, stripped of his title in 1830, restored as a feng'en fuguo gong in 1838, stripped of his title again within the same year
 Zaikuan (載寬; 1813–1838), Yihao's third son, held the title of a feng'en fuguo gong from 1830 to 1838
 Zaishou (載受), Yihao's eldest son, held the title of a fuguo jiangjun from 1831 to 1848
 Fucun (福存), Zaishou's second son, held the title of a fengguo jiangjun from 1849 to 1888
 Yujun (毓均), Fucun's eldest son, held the title of a fengguo jiangjun from 1889 to 1909, had no male heir
 Yikui (奕魁), Mianpu's second son, held the title of a third class zhenguo jiangjun from 1809 to 1818
 Zaixiu (載鏽), Yikui's eldest son, held the title of a fuguo jiangjun from 1818 to 1827, had no male heir
 Yongyu (永育), Hongwei's second son, held the title of a third class fengguo jiangjun from 1775 to 1794
 Mianyun (綿澐), Yongyu's third son, held the title of a feng'en jiangjun from 1795 to 1858
 Yitang (奕堂), Mianyun's third son, held the title of a feng'en jiangjun from 1858 to 1888
 Zaiyu (載鈺), Yitang's second son, held the title of a feng'en jiangjun in 1888
 Yongzhun (永準), Hongwei's fifth son, held the title of a first class fuguo jiangjun from 1790 to 1817, had no male heir
 Hongjin (弘晉; 1696–1717), Yunreng's third son, posthumously honoured as a feng'en fuguo gong in 1717
 Yongjing (永璥), Hongjin's third son, held the title of a feng'en fuguo gong from 1736 to 1787
 Hongyan (弘曣; 1712–1750), Yunreng's sixth son, held the title of a feng'en fuguo gong from 1728 to 1750, posthumously honoured as Feng'en Fuguo Kexi Gong (奉恩輔國恪僖公)
 Yongwei (永瑋; 1731–1788), Hongyan's eldest son, held the title of a feng'en fuguo gong from 1750 to 1787, posthumously honoured as Feng'en Fuguo Keqin Gong (奉恩輔國恪勤公)
 Mianzuo (綿佐), Yongwei's fifth son, held the title of a feng'en fuguo gong from 1788 to 1806
 Yizhi (奕質), Mianzuo's eldest son, held the title of a buru bafen fuguo gong from 1807 to 1817
 Yizan (奕贊), Mianzuo's third son, held the title of a feng'en jiangjun from 1812 to 1869, had no male heir
 Mianjun (綿俊), Yongwei's eldest son, held the title of a third class fengguo jiangjun from 1770 to 1790
 Yize (奕澤), Mianjun's eldest son, held the title of a feng'en jiangjun from 1790 to 1848
 Zaipu (載普), Yize's third son, held the title of a feng'en jiangjun from 1849 to 1885
 Purong (溥榮), Zaipu's son
 Yukuan (毓寬), Purong's second son, held the title of a feng'en jiangjun from 1885
 Miankan (綿侃), Yongwei's second son, held the title of a feng'en jiangjun from 1770 to 1797, had no male heir
 Hongtiao (弘晀; 1714–1774), Yunreng's seventh son, held the title of a feng'en fuguo gong from 1734 to 1769, stripped of his title in 1769
 Yongzeng (永增), Hongtiao's eldest son, held the title of a feng'en jiangjun from 1757 to 1779
 Miandie (綿瓞), Yongzeng's second son, held the title of a feng'en jiangjun from 1780 to 1802, stripped of his title in 1802
 Yongdeng (永璒; 1740–1770), Hongtiao's fourth son, held the title of a third class fengguo jiangjun from 1761 to 1770
 Mianbo (綿瓝; 1759–1832), Yongdeng's eldest son, held the title of a feng'en jiangjun from 1771 to 1832
 Yizhi (奕芝; 1779–1814), Mianbo's son
 Zaidai (載岱; 1802–1874), Yizhi's eldest son, succeeded Zaikuan in 1839, held the title of a feng'en fuguo gong from 1839 to 1874
 Pufeng (溥豐; 1829–1896), Zaidai's eldest son, held the title of a second class fuguo jiangjun from 1850 to 1875, promoted to feng'en fuguo gong in 1875
 Yuzhao (毓炤; 1883–?), Pufeng's fourth son, held the title of a feng'en fuguo gong from 1896
 Pusheng (溥盛), Zaidai's second son, held the title of a second class fuguo jiangjun from 1821 to 1891
 Yuyou (毓佑), Pusheng's third son, held the title of a fengguo jiangjun from 1891 to 1923
 Puzheng (溥徵), Zaidai's third son, held the title of a fuguo jiangjun from 1857 to 1889
 Yushang (毓鏛), Puzheng's eldest son, held the title of a fengguo jiangjun from 1889
 Purui (溥銳), Zaidai's sixth son, held the title of a first class fengguo jiangjun from 1886 to 1895, had no male heir
 Yongmin (永砇), Hongtiao's fifth son, held the title of a second class fengguo jiangjun from 1761 to 1764
 Mianbeng (綿𤫬), Yongmin's second son, held the title of a feng'en jiangjun from 1764 to 1811
 Yijin (奕錦), Mianbeng's third son, held the title of a feng'en jiangjun from 1816 to 1851
 Zaiji (載績), Yijin's eldest son, held the title of a feng'en jiangjun from 1851 to 1861, stripped of his title in 1861
 Yongxia (永遐), Hongtiao's seventh son, held the title of a second class fengguo jiangjun from 1761 to 1821
 Mianlie (綿烈), Yongxia's eldest son, held the title of a feng'en jiangjun from 1784 to 1816
 Yidan (奕亶), Mianlie's second son, held the title of a feng'en jiangjun from 1817 to 1842, had no male heir
 Hongwan (弘晥; 1724–1775), Yunreng's 12th son, held the title of a feng'en fuguo gong from 1738 to 1775
 Yonghao (永浩), Hongwan's second son, held the title of a buru bafen fuguo gong from 1775 to 1778

Family tree

See also
 Royal and noble ranks of the Qing dynasty

References
 

Qing dynasty princely peerages